La Liberté (trans: Liberty) was a gunboat of the Haitian Navy, which was in service from its acquisition in 1910 until 1911, when it suffered an explosion.

Service history 

The vessel was originally launched as a cargo ship under the name of SS Earl King which was modified into a gunboat in 1911 during the Revolution in Haiti. La Liberté, while in the port of Port-au-Prince, suffered an explosion from which only 23 crew members survived. The ship was declared a total loss.

References 

1910 ships
Maritime incidents in 1911
Ships of the Haitian Navy
Shipwrecks in the Caribbean Sea